The London Police Service (LPS), or simply London Police, is the municipal law enforcement agency in London, Ontario, Canada.

The LPS does not enforce federal statutes including the Criminal Code, provincial offences such as the Highway Traffic Act, as well as local municipal by-laws. Policing in Ontario is governed by the Police Services Act, which grants officers province-wide jurisdiction, though services only operate within their mandated geographical area.

History 
The London Police Force was established in 1855 and was originally headquartered on Richmond Street, overlooking the Covent Garden Market. At its inception, the force had eight sworn officers.

Constables in London were first authorized to carry firearms in 1878, though this practice was only allowed during night shifts.

The London Police Force was renamed as the London Police Service in 1991, stylistically marking the agency's focus on serving the public.

From 2016 to 2020, the London Police Service hired an additional 51 staff, marking the city of London's rapid population growth, though the service has the fewest number of police officers per capita in Southwestern Ontario.

Management

Executive Officers 
The current Chief of Police and senior executive is Stephen Williams. He is supported by two deputy chiefs: Trish McIntyre, in charge of operations, and Stuart Betts, in charge of administration.

London Police Services Board 
The service is governed by a seven member civilian police board. The current Board Chair is Dr. Javeed Sukhera, a physician and academic.

Organization 
The London Police Service is organized into divisions, branches, sections, and units. These are specialized teams tasked with various goals and help ensure the service operates effectively.

Operations

Professional Standards Branch

Legal Services

Uniformed Division 

 Patrol Operations Branch
 One Patrol Section
 Two Patrol Section
 Three Patrol Section
 Four Patrol Section
 Community Foot Patrol Unit

 Patrol Support Branch
 Operational Support Section
 Emergency Support Section
 Community Support Section
 Community Policing Section

Criminal Investigation Division 

 Support Branch
 Organized Crime Section
 Investigative Support Section

 Investigations Branch
 Sexual Assault/Child Abuse Section
 General Investigation Section
 Major Crime Section
 Guns and Drugs Section

Administration

Corporate Communications and Media Relations

Support Services Division 

 Administrative Support Branch
 Custody, Documents and Property Section
 Court and Offender Management Section
 Communications Section

 Information Technology Branch
 Support Services
 Infrastructure and Core Application Services
 Radio Services

Corporate Services Division 

 Human Resources Branch
Specialists and Coordinators
Recruiting and Training Section
 Corporate Support and Continuous Improvement Branch
 Psychological Services

Facilities, Finance and Fleet Division 

 Facilities Services
 Financial Services
 Fleet Services

Fleet 
The London Police Service has a large fleet of vehicles at its disposal, whether for patrol, canine, emergency response, or other police duties. Unlike larger municipalities in Ontario, specifically in the Greater Toronto Area (GTA), London does not have a dedicated police helicopter, although the Ontario Provincial Police employs two such aircraft for search and rescue missions, pursuits and other miscellaneous air operations.The service primarily operated the Ford Crown Victoria Police Interceptor from the 1990s to the late 2010s in both marked and unmarked capacities. The last Crown Victoria commissioned for use by the London Police Service was placed on patrol in 2017. While a small number of Crown Victoria sedans are still used by London police, these are bound to retire in the near future. This is because the LPS uses its police cars rigorously and decommissions vehicles once they reach a certain number of kilometers. Replacing the Crown Victoria have primarily been Dodge Chargers, while older SUVs have been replaced either by Ford Police Interceptor Utility or Chevrolet Tahoe PPV cruisers.

In addition to its patrol fleet, the LPS employs various vehicles for special operations. The Marine Unit has a Zodiac Hurricane boat, while the Emergency Response Unit uses light armoured vehicles donated by General Dynamics Land Systems in the most high-risk situations. The service's Traffic Management Unit also uses a few pickup trucks, including a Chevrolet Silverado and Dodge RAM 1500.

Throughout its history, the LPS has used various paint schemes on its fleet, the most recent being a modern blue and red swoosh-type design on a plain white background, which was introduced in 2012 under former Chief Bradley Duncan.

From 2018 onward, the service has equipped some of its vehicles with the StarChase GPS system, which shoots a compact suction-based tracker towards a pursued vehicle; the goal being to trace the vehicle and minimize pursuits, which can pose a severe danger to motorists and pedestrians.

References

Law enforcement agencies of Ontario
Municipal government of London, Ontario